Princess Maria Theresia von Thurn und Taxis (born Maria Theresia Ludowika Klothilde Helene Alexandra Prinzessin von Thurn und Taxis, 28 November 1980 in Regensburg), known professionally as Maria Thurn und Taxis, is a German visual artist, journalist, forest and agricultural landowner, and member of the German princely House of Thurn und Taxis. Along with her siblings, her family owns one of Europe's largest private estates.

Early life, family, and education
Maria Theresia is the eldest child and daughter of Johannes, 11th Prince of Thurn and Taxis and his wife Gloria, Princess of Thurn and Taxis (née Gräfin von Schönburg-Glauchau). Maria Theresia's family's lands form one of the largest private estates in Europe. After the death of her father in 1990, Maria Theresia was a joint heir, along with her sister Princess Elisabeth and Prince Albert, to one of the largest privately owned forests in Europe, consisting of 36,000 hectares. She and her siblings are the largest private landowners in Germany.

Maria Theresia attended elementary school and secondary school in Regensburg where she lived with her family at Schloss St. Emmeram. To acquire her qualification for university entrance, Maria Theresia's mother shielded her from the German media by sending her to England to complete her secondary education. From 2002, Maria Theresia studied sociology, psychology, and communications in Madrid. Since 2004, she studied communications and media studies with a focus on film and directing in Paris and London.

Artistic career 
Maria Theresia  worked as a freelance journalist and visual artist in London after completing school. She shares an artist studio with her husband, and produces contemporary and modern art.

Personal life
In 2001, Maria Theresia was granted compensation from the Bauer Media Group upon her appeal to the Higher Regional Court of Hamburg due to fabricated photograph montages in their Neue Post magazine claiming she was to marry Felipe, Prince of Asturias.

On 13 September 2014, she married Hugo Wilson, a British artist based in London, in a Catholic ceremony at St. Joseph's Church in Tutzing, Germany.

On 29 April 2015, it was announced that Maria Theresia and Hugo Wilson were expecting their first child. On 21 August, Maria Theresia gave birth to a girl, named Mafalda Beatrix Mary, in London, England. A second daughter, Maya Romy Alexandra, was born on 22 September 2017.

Decorations
  Dame of Honour and Devotion in Obedience of the Sovereign Military Hospitaller Order of Saint John of Jerusalem, of Rhodes and of Malta (20 June 2009).
  Dame Grand Cross of the Order of Perfect Friendship.

Ancestry

References

1980 births
21st-century German painters
Living people
People from Regensburg
Princesses of Thurn und Taxis
German women painters
German women journalists
German people of Austrian descent
German people of Belarusian descent
German people of French descent
German people of Hungarian descent
German people of Italian descent
German people of Polish descent
German people of Portuguese descent
German people of Russian descent
German people of Spanish descent
21st-century German women